The 2013 Clio Cup China Series is a multi-event, one make motor racing championship held across China. The championship features a mix of professional motor racing drivers and gentlemen drivers in the region, competing in a Clio Renault Sport 200 that conform to the technical regulations for the championship.

This season will be the 5th Clio Cup China Series season. The season started on 9 June at Shanghai Tianma Circuit and concluded on 13 October at Zhuhai International Circuit after 10 races to be held at 5 meetings. 4 race meetings were in support of the 2013 China Touring Car Championship and a round in Chengdu Goldenport Circuit was a supporting race for Sichuan Touring Car Elites.

Teams and drivers

Championship Standings
Championship is count towards the 8 best results from 10 races.

Notes:
 — Max Wiser was the winner of R1 and R2, but he was ineligible for points or prizes.
Points in brackets are dropped as Championship only counts towards the 8 best results out of 10 rounds.

References

External links
 Official website of Clio Cup China

Clio Cup China